Edward Russell "Slick" Moulton (April 21, 1900 – October 14, 1979) was an educator as well as a college football and baseball player and coach.

Auburn
"Slick" attended Auburn University, where he played for the football and baseball teams. On the football team, Slick was an All-Southern end for Mike Donahue, and was selected by coach Donahue for his All-time Auburn team. Walter Camp gave Moulton honorable mention on his All-America team in 1922. After graduation Moulton stayed coaching baseball and was an assistant football coach at Auburn High School.

Educator
Moulton was instrumental in the founding and organization of the Georgia Education Association, where he served as president.

Lindale
Moulton was brought to Lindale in 1929, where he was superintendent of schools and manager of the Lindale baseball team for 37 years.

References

1900 births
1979 deaths
Sportspeople from Mobile, Alabama
Sportspeople from Rome, Georgia
Auburn Tigers football players
20th-century American educators
Auburn Tigers baseball players
Baseball players from Alabama
Players of American football from Alabama
American football ends
High school baseball coaches in the United States
All-Southern college football players
Auburn High School (Alabama) people